Deborah Esther Lipstadt (born March 18, 1947) is an American historian and academic, best known as author of the books Denying the Holocaust (1993), History on Trial: My Day in Court with a Holocaust Denier (2005), The Eichmann Trial (2011), and Antisemitism: Here and Now (2019). She has served as the United States Special Envoy for Monitoring and Combating Anti-Semitism since May 3, 2022. Since 1993 she has been the Dorot Professor of Modern Jewish History and Holocaust Studies at Emory University in Atlanta, Georgia, US.

Lipstadt was a consultant to the United States Holocaust Memorial Museum. In 1994, President of the United States Bill Clinton appointed her to the United States Holocaust Memorial Council, and she served two terms. On July 30, 2021, President Joe Biden nominated her to be the United States Special Envoy for Monitoring and Combating Anti-Semitism. She was confirmed by voice-vote on March 30, 2022, and sworn in on May 3, 2022.

Life and career
Lipstadt was born in New York City to a Jewish family, the daughter of Miriam (née Peiman; 1915–2013) and Erwin Lipstadt (1903–1972). Her mother was born in Canada, and her father, a salesman, was born in Germany. Her parents met at their neighborhood synagogue. She has an older sister, Helene, a historian, and a younger brother, Nathaniel, an investor on Wall Street.

In her youth, she studied at the Hebrew Institute of Long Island, and grew up in Far Rockaway, Queens. She studied with Rabbi Emanuel Rackman at Temple Shaarei Tefillah. Lipstadt spent summers at Camp Massad.

She spent her junior year of college in Israel during the Six-Day War, where she stayed as an exchange student at the Hebrew University of Jerusalem. She completed her undergraduate work in American history at the City College of New York in 1969, receiving a BA. She then enrolled at Brandeis University where she completed her Masters in 1972 and then her Ph.D. in Near Eastern and Judaic Studies in 1976. Her doctoral dissertation was entitled "The Zionist Career of Louis Lipsky, 1900–1921".

After receiving her Ph.D., Lipstadt began teaching, first at the University of Washington in Seattle from 1974 to 1979, then as an assistant professor at UCLA. When she was denied tenure there, she left in 1985 to be the director of the independent Brandeis-Bardin Institute for two years, during which time she also wrote a monthly column for The Jewish Spectator. Lipstadt then received a research fellowship from the Vidal Sassoon International Center for the Study of Antisemitism at Hebrew University of Jerusalem, during which she studied Holocaust denial, and taught at Occidental College part time.

Lipstadt then became an Assistant Professor of Religion at Emory University in Atlanta in January 1993, becoming the Dorot Professor of Modern Jewish and Holocaust Studies that fall. She helped to create the Institute for Jewish Studies there.

US Antisemitism Envoy
In May 2021, Lipstadt was considered for an ambassadorship position at the Office to Monitor and Combat Anti-Semitism in the Biden administration.

On July 30, 2021, President Joe Biden nominated Lipstadt for this role. Opposition from Senator Ron Johnson, whom she had tweeted was advocating "white supremacy/nationalism", delayed her nomination for many months. Her initial nomination expired at the end of the year and was returned to President Biden on January 3, 2022.

The Senate Foreign Relations Committee held hearings on her nomination on February 8, 2022. On March 29, 2022, the committee favorably reported her nomination out of committee. Her nomination was supported by all committee Democrats, as well as senators Mitt Romney and Marco Rubio. Her nomination was confirmed by voice vote on March 30, 2022, and she was sworn in on May 3, 2022.

David Irving libel suit

On September 5, 1996, author David Irving sued Lipstadt and her publisher Penguin Books for libel in an English court for characterizing some of his writings and public statements as Holocaust denial in her book Denying the Holocaust.

Lipstadt's legal defense team was led by Anthony Julius of Mishcon de Reya while Penguin's was led by Kevin Bays and Mark Bateman of Davenport Lyons. Both defendants instructed Richard Rampton QC, while Penguin also instructed Heather Rogers as junior counsel. The expert witnesses for the defence included Cambridge historian Richard J. Evans, Christopher Browning, Robert Jan van Pelt, and Peter Longerich.

English libel law places the burden of proof on the defendant rather than the plaintiff. Lipstadt and Penguin won the case using the justification defense, namely by demonstrating in court that Lipstadt's accusations against Irving were substantially true and therefore not libelous. The case was argued as a bench trial before Mr Justice Gray, who produced a written judgment 349 pages long detailing Irving's systematic distortion of the historical record of World War II. The Times (April 14, 2000, p. 23) said of Lipstadt's victory, "History has had its day in court and scored a crushing victory."

Despite her acrimonious history with Irving, Lipstadt has stated that she is personally opposed to the three-year prison sentence Austria imposed on Irving for two speeches he made in 1989, where he claimed there had been no gas chambers at Auschwitz. In Austria, minimizing the atrocities of the Third Reich is a crime punishable with up to 10 years' imprisonment. Speaking of Irving, Lipstadt said, "I am uncomfortable with imprisoning people for speech. Let him go and let him fade from everyone's radar screens ... Generally, I don't think Holocaust denial should be a crime. I am a free speech person, I am against censorship."

Commentary
In February 2007, Lipstadt warned of "soft-core denial" at the Zionist Federation's annual fundraising dinner in London. Referring to groups such as the Muslim Council of Britain, reportedly she stated: "When groups of people refuse to commemorate Holocaust Memorial Day unless equal time is given to anti-Muslim prejudice, this is soft-core denial." According to Jonny Paul, "She received huge applause when she asked how former United States President Jimmy Carter could omit the years 1939–1947 from a chronology in his book"; referring to his recently published and controversial book Palestine: Peace Not Apartheid, she said: "When a former president of the United States writes a book on the Israeli–Palestinian crisis and writes a chronology at the beginning of the book in order to help them understand the emergence of the situation and in that chronology lists nothing of importance between 1939 and 1947, that is soft-core denial."

Along the same lines, Lipstadt has criticized the German philosopher and historian Ernst Nolte for engaging in what she calls "soft-core denial" of the Holocaust, arguing that Nolte practices an even more dangerous form of negationism than the Holocaust deniers. Speaking of Nolte in a 2003 interview, Lipstadt stated:

In late 2011, Lipstadt attacked American and Israeli politicians for what she called their invocation of the Holocaust for contemporary political purposes, something she thought mangled history. She rebuked Republican Party presidential candidates for speeches that 'pandered' to the Evangelical constituency, as much as it did to the Republican Jewish Coalition. She also judged Howard Gutman's remarks on causal links between Muslim antisemitism and the Israeli–Palestinian conflict as "stupid". According to Haaretz, "She decried the 'hysteria' and 'neuroses' of many Jews and Israelis who compare the current situation in Europe and in the Middle East to the Holocaust-era":

In the same interview, she argued that "If anti-Semitism becomes the reason through which your Jewish view of the world is refracted, if it becomes your prism, then it is very unhealthy. Jewish tradition never wanted that." She said "You listen to Newt Gingrich talking about the Palestinians as an 'invented people'—it's out-Aipacking AIPAC, it's out-Israeling Israel". On a visit to London in September 2014, Lipstadt criticized the Israeli government and said that the government had "cheapened" the memory of the Holocaust by using it to justify war. She has also rejected the view that Israeli military actions during the 2014 Israel–Gaza conflict constituted a genocide.

Lipstadt returned to the theme of soft-core Holocaust denial in The Atlantic when responding to the Trump administration's statement on International Holocaust Remembrance Day, January 27, 2017, which was condemned for the absence of a specific mention of Jews, as the principal victims of the Holocaust or of antisemitism itself. "The Holocaust was de-Judaized. It is possible that it all began with a mistake. Someone simply did not realize what they were doing. It is also possible that someone did this deliberately."

In February 2019, Lipstadt resigned her membership in the Young Israel synagogue movement because its national council president defended Israeli Prime Minister Benjamin Netanyahu's facilitation of a merger between the Bayit Yehudi party and the extremist Otzma Yehudit party.

In October 2019, Lipstadt had a letter to the editor published in The New York Times, prompted by the awarding of the Nobel Prize in Literature to Peter Handke, in which she wrote that the Nobel Committee awarded Handke a platform "he does not deserve" and that "the public does not need him to have", adding that such a platform could convince some that his "false claims must have some legitimacy".

Awards and honors
After the publication of Denying the Holocaust in June 1993, Lipstadt received the 1994 National Jewish Book Award. Already a consultant to the United States Holocaust Memorial Museum, President Bill Clinton appointed her in 1994 to the United States Holocaust Memorial Council. In 1997, Lipstadt received the Emory Williams teaching award for excellence in teaching. She is also a recipient of the Albert D. Chernin Award from the Jewish Council for Public Affairs, which is given to "an American Jew whose work best exemplifies the social justice imperatives of Judaism, Jewish history and the protection of the Bill of Rights, particularly the First Amendment." Previous recipients of the Award include Ruth Bader Ginsburg and Alan Dershowitz. Lipstadt was awarded the 2005 National Jewish Book Award in the Holocaust category for History on Trial: My Day in Court with a Holocaust Denier and the 2019 National Jewish Book Award in Education and Jewish Identity for Antisemitism: Here and Now.

Lipstadt has received honorary doctorates from a number of institutions, including Ohio Wesleyan University, John Jay College of Criminal Justice of the City University of New York, Yeshiva University, and the Jewish Theological Seminary of America, among others.

Works

 Autobiographies
 History on Trial: My Day in Court with a Holocaust Denier (2005), memoir

 Biographies
 The Zionist Career of Louis Lipsky, 1900–1921 (1982), Lipstadt's dissertation as a book, written in 1976

 History
 An Outline of American Zionist History 1759–1948 (1971)
 Beyond Belief: The American Press and the Coming of the Holocaust, 1933–1945 (1985)
 Denying the Holocaust: The Growing Assault on Truth and Memory (1993)
 The Eichmann Trial (2011)
 Holocaust: An American Understanding (2016)
 Antisemitism: Here and Now (2018)

In popular culture
Actress Rachel Weisz portrayed Lipstadt in Denial (2016), a film based on her 2005 book History on Trial: My Day in Court with David Irving, directed by Mick Jackson.

References

External links

 
 Deborah Lipstadt Faculty biography at Emory University.
 Deborah Lipstadt's blog.
 Voices on Antisemitism Podcast  Deborah Lipstadt interview and transcript from the United States Holocaust Memorial Museum (2007) 
 Holocaust Denial on Trial, a project of the Rabbi Donald A. Tam Institute for Jewish Studies at Emory University.
 David Irving case, report by The Guardian.
 Deborah Lipstadt in Jewish Women: A Comprehensive Historical Encyclopedia.
 
 
 

1947 births
21st-century American historians
21st-century American women
American people of Canadian descent
American people of German-Jewish descent
American women historians
Brandeis University alumni
City College of New York alumni
Emory University faculty
Historians from New York (state)
Historians of Nazism
Historians of the Holocaust
Holocaust denial
Jewish American historians
Living people
People from Far Rockaway, Queens
Scholars of antisemitism
Jewish women writers